Hum Chale Aaye (English: We Came Running) is a 2018 Pakistani tele-film directed by Mehreen Jabbar, written by Syed Muhammad Ahmed and produced by Abdullah Kadwani and Asad Qureshi under the banner of 7th Sky Entertainment. The tele-film starred Madiha Imam, Hina Dilpazir and Marina Khan in lead roles. The film was released on Eid-ul-Fitr 2018.

Synopsis 
Hum Chalay Aye is the story of two brothers whose wives can’t stand each other. When the younger brother and his wife has to move into the family house where the older brother and his wife have been living, the husbands and the children have to band together to make sure that World War III does not erupt.

Cast
Madiha Imam as Sila
Hina Dilpazir as Farzana
Marina Khan as Nusrat
Ahmed Zeb 
Furqan Qureshi
Arjumand Azhar
Khalid Nizami
Syed Mohammad Ahmed

Production
In August 2017, director Mehreen Jabbar revealed to Gulf News that her new project is a film for the small screen and also announced the lead actors. Produced by 7th Sky Entertainment and written by Syed Muhammad Ahmed the film starred Madiha Imam and the notable comedy actress Hina Dilpazir who has appeared in well known comedies such as Hum Sab Ajeeb Se Hain and Quddusi Sahab Ki Bewah. The first promo of the film was released on 8 June 2018 on Geo TV's official You Tube page.

References

External links 

 Hum Chale Aaye on Official website
 

Pakistani television films
2010s Urdu-language films
2018 films